High Wycombe F.C. was an English association football based in High Wycombe in Buckinghamshire.

History
The club was formed in 1871 and played its first match in December that year, against Marlow. The match was affected by both a dense fog and "the behaviour of the spectators, who joined to the insolence of the town the coarseness and boorishness of the country rough, and thoroughly impeded the game,on two occasions bringing it to an actual standstill."  Like many other provincial clubs, High Wycombe was not a club of those from the public schools; the club's final captain and secretary, Arthur Thurlow, was a corn merchant.
  
The club's first entry to the FA Cup was in 1873-74.  The scheduled first round opponents, the Old Etonians, withdrew, as at this time the better players had chosen to play for the Wanderers.  The club lost to Maidenhead in the second round.

The club entered the Cup in the next four seasons, suffering a 15-0 defeat to the Royal Engineers in 1875-76 and withdrawing the following year to avoid similar humiliation at the hands of Cambridge University, but in 1877-78 the club finally won a tie for the first time, beating Wood Grange at West Ham Park 4-0 in the first round.  However, in the second round, the club lost 9-0 at home to the Wanderers, and although the club completed a full season of matches, its last match appears to have been a 2-0 win over Aylesbury on 28 March 1878., as for the following season four of its most regular players joined Marlow.

Colours

The club's colours throughout its history were orange and black, except for the 1877-78 season, when it wore navy and red.

References

Defunct football clubs in England
Defunct football clubs in Buckinghamshire
Association football clubs established in 1871
Association football clubs disestablished in the 19th century